Jamuna Kinare is a 1984 Braj Bhasha language film based on Braj culture. It was produced by Kaka Hathrasi and directed by Dr. Laxminarayan Garg. The story was written by Ashok Chakradhar. Lyrics was written by Kaka Hathrasi, Natharam Sharma Gaur, Maya Govind, Som Thakur, Dr. Mohan Pradip, Kapil Kumar, Balkrishna Garg, Ramendra Tripathi.

Cast 
 Pradeep Saxena
 Sabnam Kapoor
 Kapil Kumar
 Narendra Katyan
 Kaka Hathrasi
 Abhi Bhattacharya
 Satyen Kappu
 S. N. Tripathi
 Virendra Tarun
 Mukesh Garg
 Amal Sen
 Pramod Bala
 Radha Yadav

Music 
The music for "Jamuna Kinare" was composed by musician duo of "Laxmi-Sardar" [Dr. Laxminarayan Garg & Sardar Malik (not Bollywood music director Anu Malik's father & eminent Music Director Sardar Malik)]

References

External links 
 Sangeet Karyalaya,Hathras
 
 Indian Censor Board site

1983 films
Braj Bhasha language films
Films shot in Uttar Pradesh